Serra d'En Celler is a mountain range of the Valencian Community, Spain. Its main peaks are 1,281 m high Tossal de la Nevera and Tossal d'Orenga (1,144 m).

Geography
The heights of the Serra d'En Celler range are frequently covered with snow every winter and Tossal de la Nevera, its highest peak, is named after an ice pit (nevera), where snow was gathered for local use in former times.

This mountain range is located within the Ares del Maestrat and Catí municipal terms, in a relatively uninhabited area. The easiest route to reach it is from Catí or Albocàsser. Tossal d'Orenga is a popular mountain among those who do paragliding in the region.

See also
Alt Maestrat
Mountains of the Valencian Community
La Valltorta

References

External links 

 Zonas de Vuelo - Tossal d'Orenga
 Turimaestrat
Tossal de la Nevera

Alt Maestrat
En Celler
En Celler